Jay Latimer McMullen (April 8, 1921 – March 10, 2012) was an investigative journalist for CBS News.

Early years
McMullen was born on April 8, 1921 in Minneapolis, Minnesota. He grew up in Cleveland, Ohio. He briefly attended Dartmouth College. After the war, he completed his undergraduate degree at Columbia University (B.S. in 1948).

Career

World War II
In 1941, McMullen served with the Volunteer Ambulance Corps. In 1943, he enlisted with the United States Army for World War II, with whom he served two years as an Army correspondent for the NBC Radio program, "Army Hour."

CBS
He joined CBS Radio in 1949 and later switched to television with CBS News. In 1954, McMullen was honored with an award for a radio piece on adoption entitled "Babies, C.O.D."  In 1958, he received the George Polk Award for a story, "Who Killed Michael Farmer," about the murder of a disabled boy by a gang. Edward R. Murrow was the narrator. In 1961, McMullen made an undercover film, "Biography of a Bookie Joint," which led to the demotion of some high-ranking Boston Police officers and the resignation of commissioner Leo J. Sullivan. Concealed in a lunchbox, an 8-mm camera recorded bets being taken in the back room of a key shop and a camera in an apartment window across the street filmed police officers entering and leaving the premises. McMullen and Walter Cronkite were the narrators. The 1964 CBS Evening News ran a story on illegal mail-order traffic in amphetamines and barbiturates which, in turn, spurred the creation of the Drug Control Act of 1965. In 1967, he was the recipient of The Hillman Prize for "The Tenement."

McMullen's 1972 undercover film, "The Mexican Connection," was a dangerous investigation that won an Emmy. Posing as a prospective drug buyer, he spent eight months in Mexico documenting how marijuana and opium were smuggled by airplane into the U.S., and was able to capture a deal with his hidden camera and microphone.

He retired from CBS News in 1984.

Death
McMullen died on March 10, 2012, at the age of 90 in Greenwich, Connecticut.

References

1921 births
2012 deaths
People from Minneapolis
Television personalities from Cleveland
People from Greenwich, Connecticut
American male journalists
Journalists from Ohio
United States Army personnel of World War II